WDHP (1620 AM) is a radio station licensed to serve Frederiksted, U.S. Virgin Islands. The station is owned by Reef Broadcasting, Inc.  It airs a variety of news, talk, gospel music, and country music.

Programming
WDHP currently airs a mix of Reggae, Calypso, Soca, R&B, Latin, Country & Western music, talk and news. In addition to its regular programming, this station airs the "dLife Diabetes Minute" health advisory program.

History

WDHP began as the "expanded band" twin to station WRRA in Frederiksted. On March 17, 1997, the Federal Communications Commission (FCC) announced that 88 stations had been given permission to move to newly available "Expanded Band" transmitting frequencies, ranging from 1610 to 1700 kHz, with WRRA authorized to move from 1290 to 1620 kHz.

An application for a construction permit for the expanded band station was filed on June 13, 1997, which was assigned the call letters WDHP on March 6, 1998. The FCC's initial policy was that both the original station and its expanded band counterpart could operate simultaneously for up to five years, after which owners would have to turn in one of the two licenses, depending on whether they preferred the new assignment or elected to remain on the original frequency, although this deadline was extended multiple times.

It was ultimately decided to end operations at the original station, and on February 8, 2011 the license for WRRA on 1290 kHz was cancelled.

References

External links
WDHP official website

Variety radio stations in insular areas of the United States
Radio stations established in 2002
2002 establishments in the United States Virgin Islands
Radio stations in the United States Virgin Islands
Saint Croix, U.S. Virgin Islands
Full service radio stations in the United States